Royal Blues may refer to:

 Royal Blues F.C., a Taiwanese football club
 Royal Blues (album), by Dragonette